The Roman Catholic Diocese of Doba is a diocese in Doba in the Ecclesiastical province of N'Djamena in Chad.

History
 March 6, 1989: Established as Diocese of Doba from the Diocese of Moundou

Bishops
 Bishops of Doba (Roman rite)
 Bishop Michele Russo, M.C.C.I. (March 6, 1989, – January 30, 2014)
 Bishop Martin Waïngue Bani (since December 10, 2016)

 Other priest of this diocese who became bishop
 Joachim Kouraleyo Tarounga, appointed Bishop of Moundou in 2004

See also
Roman Catholicism in Chad

Sources
 GCatholic.org

Doba
Doba
Roman Catholic dioceses and prelatures established in the 20th century
Doba